British Honduras (now Belize) competed in the Summer Olympic Games for the first time at the 1968 Summer Olympics in Mexico City, Mexico. Seven competitors, all men, took part in six events in four sports.

Some speculated that the Tlatelolco massacre would discourage British Honduras's participation in the Games, but the British Honduran athletes persevered. They won no medals, however.

Athletics

Men
Track & road events

Field events

Cycling

Two cyclists represented Belize in 1968.

Track cycling

Ranks given are within the heat.

Shooting

Two male shooters represented Belize in 1968.

Weightlifting

References

External links
Official Olympic Reports

Nations at the 1968 Summer Olympics
1968
1968 in British Honduras